Earl Caldwell (27 October 1912 – 20 July 1983) was a Canadian sports shooter. He competed in the trap event at the 1956 Summer Olympics.

References

1912 births
1983 deaths
Canadian male sport shooters
Olympic shooters of Canada
Shooters at the 1956 Summer Olympics
Sportspeople from Saskatchewan
20th-century Canadian people